James Eyre (1748–1813), was an English philologist.

Eyre was educated at Trinity College, Oxford and Caius College, Cambridge. He became head-master of Solihull Grammar School for thirty years until his death, and rector of Winterbourne Stoke (1801–13) and Nettleton (1802-13) in Wiltshire. He annotated Samuel Johnson's English Dictionary (in manuscript), and his notes were incorporated by Henry John Todd in his edition of Johnson's Dictionary.

He died in 1813.

References

1748 births
1813 deaths
English Christian religious leaders
English philologists
English lexicographers
18th-century philologists
19th-century philologists
Alumni of Trinity College, Oxford
Alumni of Gonville and Caius College, Cambridge
18th-century English educators
19th-century English educators